Bellator Kickboxing was an American kickboxing promotion company based in Los Angeles, active between 2016 and 2019. Bellator was founded in 2016 by president Scott Coker. It was the sister promotion of Bellator MMA. On April 16, 2016, Bellator held its inaugural kickboxing event, Bellator Kickboxing 1.

Events

Broadcast partners 
Bellator Kickboxing airs on Paramount Network (formerly Spike TV). Bellator Kickboxing debuted on Spike on April 16, 2016.

Last champions

Championship history

Welterweight Championship 
 to

Featherweight Championship 
 to

Women's Flyweight Championship 
 to

Notable fighters

Middleweights (185 lb, 84 kg) 

  Filip Verlinden
  Joe Schilling
  John Wayne Parr
  Melvin Manhoef

Welterweights (170 lb, 77 kg) 

  Karim Ghajji
  Mustapha Haida
  Raymond Daniels

Lightweight (155 lb, 70 kg) 

  Amansio Paraschiv
  Giorgio Petrosyan

Featherweights (145 lb, 65 kg) 

  Gabriel Varga
  Kevin Ross

Women's Featherweights (145 lb, 65 kg) 

  Jorina Baars

Women's Flyweights (125 lb, 56 kg) 

  Denise Kielholtz

See also 

 List of Bellator MMA events
 Kickboxing promotions
 Bellator MMA
 List of Bellator champions

References

External links 
 

Kickboxing organizations
Kickboxing
2016 establishments in the United States
Sports organizations established in 2016
Kickboxing in North America